Edesheim is a municipality in the Südliche Weinstraße district, in Rhineland-Palatinate, Germany. Paul Henri Thiry d’Holbach was born here.

References

Municipalities in Rhineland-Palatinate
Südliche Weinstraße